Blie, Qazaqstan! is the Kazakh version of the popular reality TV series So You Think You Can Dance. It is shown on Khabar TV in Kazakhstan. Hosted by Aisulu Azimbayeva and Aset Arystanbekov, the Kazakh version of the popular reality series completed its inaugural of 1 season with Zhanbolat Yertayev as the champion,  and 2 season with Aisulu Smagulbekova as the champion.

References

External links
Official website of Bile, Qazaqstan!

Kazakhstani television shows
Non-American television series based on American television series